I've Gotta Horse is Billy Fury's second hit feature film, a semi-autobiographical musical comedy that also features Amanda Barrie, Michael Medwin and Jon Pertwee and pop bands The Gamblers and  The Bachelors. It also features Fury's own race horse, Anselmo, and several of his own dogs. Larry Parnes, Billy Fury's manager, co-wrote the original story and co-produced, while Kenneth Hume directed, co-produced and co-wrote the story, with musical direction by Mike Leander. This 1965 U.K. release was filmed on location in Techniscope at Great Yarmouth where Fury had just finished his summer season at the Royal Aquarium Theatre which was used as the theatre in the film, with shooting also taking place at Shepperton Studios. The film is also known as Wonderful Day.

Plot 
Based on the star's famous love of animals, this musical comedy portrays Billy setting out to add a sheepdog to his vast entourage of animals and coming back with an irresistible horse named Armitage instead.  To his manager's horror, Billy smuggles the horse backstage during rehearsals for his big show and the horse proceeds to create havoc.  Little do either of them know that Armitage is actually a thoroughbred racehorse.  Then Billy's horse contracts pneumonia and Billy must choose between love of his horse and the big show.

Cast 

Billy Fury as Billy
Amanda Barrie as Jo
Michael Medwin as Hymie Campbell
Marjorie Rhodes as Mrs Bartholomew
Bill Fraser as Mr Bartholomew
Peter Gilmore as Jock
Allan Angel as Dancer
Peter Ardran as Dancer
The Bachelors as themselves
Tom Bowman as Trainer
Elisa Buckingham as Melissa
Linda Bywaters as Dancer
Elaine Carr as Dancer
Tom Carty as Dancer
Michael Cashman as Peter
Doreen Cran as Dancer
Ronald Curran as Dancer
Roy Durbin as Dancer
Leslie Dwyer as Bert
Fred Emney as Lord Bentley
John Falconer as Butler
The Gamblers as themselves
Richard Gardner as Dancer
Terry Gilbert as Dancer
Bill Harvey as Dancer
Derina House as Dancer
John Kelly as Michael – Donkey Man
Ann Lancaster as Woman Shopkeeper
Pauline Loring as Lady Bentley
Constance Luttrell as Duchess
Cal McCord as Whitney
Rosemary Neil-Smith as Lady Sloane
Sheila O'Neill as Betty
Jon Pertwee as Costumier's Assistant
Gareth Robinson as Jockey
Brian Todd as Dancer

Soundtrack 
The following songs were performed in the film:
 "I've Gotta Horse" -Written by David Heneker and John Taylor. -Performed by Billy Fury
 "Stand by Me" -Written by David Heneker and John Taylor. -Performed by Billy Fury
 "Do the Old Soft Shoe" -Written by Jay Taylor. -Performed by Billy Fury and Sheilla O'Neill
 "I Cried All Night" -Written by David Heneker and John Taylor. -Performed by The Gamblers (British band)
 "Far Far Away" -Written by Jimmy Kennedy. -Performed by The Bachelors
 "I Like Animals" -Written by David Heneker and John Taylor. -Performed by Bill Fury
 "Find Your Dream" -Written by John Taylor. -Performed by Billy Fury
 "Dressed Up For a Man" -Written by David Heneker and John Taylor. -Performed by Amanda Barrie
 "He's Got the Whole World in His Hands" -Written by Phil Raymond, Richard Gregory and Lew Griffiths   -Performed by The Bachelors
 "Won't Somebody Tell Me Why"  -Written by David Heneker and John Taylor. -Performed by Billy Fury
 "Problems" -Written by David Heneker and John Taylor. -Performed by Amanda Barrie and Michael Medwin
 "You've Got to Look Right for the Part" -Written by David Heneker and John Taylor. -Performed by Billy Fury, Amanda Barrie and Jon Pertwee
 "I Must Be Dreaming" -Written by Jackie DeShannon and Sharon Sheeley. -Performed by Billy Fury
 "Like a Child"
 "My Friend"
 "How Can You Tell"
 "Finale Melody" -Written by David Heneker and John Taylor. -Performed by Billy Fury
 "Wonderful Day" -Written by Mike Leander. -Performed by the cast.

Billy Fury's numbers included his backing group "The Gamblers", consisting of Jim Crawford (lead guitar/vocals), Alan George (piano/organ), Andy Mac (drums), Ken Brady (sax), Tony Diamond (guitar, trumpet, vocals) and Alan Sanders (bass vocals).

The film's soundtrack album entitled "I've Gotta Horse" was released in March 1965. It was produced by Dick Rowe for Decca Records (Decca LK 4677). It does not include four of the songs from the film: I Must Be Dreaming, Like a Child, My Friend and How Can You Tell.

References

External links 
I've Gotta Horse at sixtiescity.net

1965 films
1965 musical comedy films
British musical comedy films
Films about horses
British horse racing films
1960s English-language films
1960s British films